The Rising Stars were a Zimbabwean first-class cricket team that was formed in 2017. They played their home matches at Takashinga Cricket Club, Highfield, Harare. The team was founded by Zimbabwe's former Test cricket captain Tatenda Taibu. They played in Zimbabwe's domestic cricket competitions, starting with the 2017–18 Logan Cup.

In October 2017, they lost their opening first-class fixture in the Logan Cup to the Mid West Rhinos by 7 wickets. Despite the loss, Zimbabwe's former captain Brendan Taylor praised the team saying that they have some excellent bowlers and deserve their first-class status. Later the same month, in the third round of fixtures, they won their maiden first-class match, beating Matabeleland Tuskers by 268 runs.

In May 2018, they qualified for the final of the 2017–18 Pro50 Championship, in their first season of competing in the Pro50 Championship tournament, after finishing top in the group stage. In the final, they beat Mountaineers by 144 runs to win their first title, with Tony Munyonga named the player of the series.

However, with Zimbabwe Cricket facing financial issues during the 2017–18 season, it was unlikely that the Rising Stars would take part in the 2018–19 season. In October 2018, it was confirmed that the team would be disbanded, with players distributed between the other four franchise teams in Zimbabwe.

Squad
For the 2017–18 season, the squad contained the following players:

 Tarisai Musakanda (c)
 Faraz Akram
 Eddie Byrom
 Ryan Burl
 Aarsh Jha
 Tinashe Kamunhukamwe
 Rugare Magarira
 William Mashinge
 Brandon Mavuta
 Tony Munyonga
 Taffy Mupariwa 
 Ryan Murray
 Blessing Muzarabani
 Richard Ngarava
 Thamsanqa Nunu
 Tendai Nyamayaro
 Mkhululi Nyathi
 Milton Shumba
 Tafadzwa Tsiga (wk)
 Honest Ziwira

References

External links
 Rising Stars at CricketArchive

Zimbabwean first-class cricket teams
Cricket clubs established in 2017
Cricket clubs disestablished in 2018
Sport in Harare